Oneflare is an Australian online marketplace that connects customers and businesses. Billy Tucker joined Oneflare as CEO in February 2017.

Overview 
The website has over 150 service categories from plumbers and electricians to pet groomers and interior designers to service the desired job. Submitting a job request is free, and customers can expect to receive up to 3 competitive quotes from nearby businesses.

History
Oneflare generates possible leads and allows businesses to pay Oneflare for the opportunity to call or email a potential lead.

In July 2014, Oneflare announced its acquisition of Renovate Forum, an Australian online renovation community. In the same year. the company's 1635% of growth earned a place in Deloitte's Tech Fast 500 in APAC.

In February 2015, Oneflare acquired Melbourne-based reviews website, Word of Mouth Online (WOMO).

Funding

Oneflare is a venture backed startup that initially secured a A$50,000 Skills and Knowledge grant from Commercialisation Australia to engage professional external advisors to raise investment capital, develop website architecture and procure professional legal advice.

In May 2016, the company announced a partnership with the Fairfax's Domain Group to secure $15M investment in exchange for 35% equity, driving up the company's value to around $43M.

In May 2022, Airtasker acquired Oneflare for $2.25 million in cash and Airtasker shares issued at 43 cents, with 50 per cent placed in escrow for 12 months from issue and the rest in escrow for 24 months, a fraction of the nearly $50 million it was valued at in 2016 when Domain took a stake.

Service process
Visitors to the oneflare website are guided to provide their details and the details of the task they may want performed, free of charge. The 'request' is then sent to a maximum of 3 service providers who pay oneflare for the opportunity to see an email address or a phone number of the visitor to the website.  In addition to trades such as electricians, landscapers and plumbers, the site lists over 200 service categories, including accountants, interior designers, cleaners, computer repairers and photographers. Australian service providers are charged an 'activation fee' to register. As part of the rating system, the site verifies the licensing, ABN and insurance/ indemnity details of service providers.

Real-time application (IOS & Android), SMS and email updates are sent to businesses, notifying them of relevant leads. The website provides the consumer with three quotations so the consumer can choose their preferred provider, who is contracted directly through the website to complete the work. The site includes a customer helpdesk and profile tools to recognised businesses that are insured.

References

External links
Company website

Companies established in 2011
Companies based in Sydney
Internet properties established in 2011
Privately held companies of Australia
Online marketplaces of Australia